Suraj Tal, also called 
It is the third highest lake in India, and the 21st-highest in the world. Suraj Tal Lake is just below the source of the Bhaga River that joins the Chandra River downstream at Tandi to form the Chandrabhaga River in Himachal Pradesh. The Chandrabhaga River is known as the  Chenab as it enters the Jammu region of Jammu and Kashmir. The other major tributary of the Chandrabhaga, the Chandra originates and flows south-east of the Bara-lacha La.

Access
It is approachable by National Highway NH 21, also known as the Leh-Manali Highway. The road skirts Suraj Tal which is just  short of the Bara-lacha-la pass. It remains inaccessible during the winter months of November to April since the pass becomes totally snowbound during this period.

Physical description

Terrain

The lake is fed from the glaciers and nullahs (streams) originating from the Bara-lacha-la pass.  The pass is 8 km long and is also called the "Pass with crossroads on summit" since roads from Zanskar, Ladakh, Spiti and Lahaul meet at this pass. In addition to the Bhaga River that originates from it and flows through Suraj Tal, Bara-lacha-la Pass is also the source of the Chandra and Yunan Rivers in the southeast and north, respectively.

The lake is situated in the Upper Himalayan Zone or High Latitudinal Zone part of the Himalayas which has very sparse population with climatic conditions akin to polar conditions. Snowfall in this zone, though scanty, is reported to be spread all round the year. Rainfall precipitation is rare in the region. The precipitation starts melting from May. Snow on slopes is generally slackly bonded, with wind redistributing it. The average total snowfall recorded in a year is reported to be  with highest temperature , mean highest temperature , mean minimum temperature  and lowest temperature . The ground in the zone is covered with scree and boulders.

Geology
The Lake's geology is similar to the nearby Bara-lacha-la Pass, which is reported to be an early rifting event on the northern Indian passive margin and that the Basalts which are emplaced along the trans–tensional faults indicate that.

Bhaga Valley
The Bhaga River originates in Bara-lacha La and flows north-west through Suraj Tal to Tandi, the confluence point with Chandra River. The valley, which is a narrow gorge, is devoid of any vegetation up to Darcha and thereafter it widens up to its confluence with Chandra River at Tandi with terraces between Darcha and Tandi which are under cultivation in the lower slopes, with the middle slopes having  grasslands. Plantation of trees and shrubs to meet fuel wood and fodder requirements have been done on the hill slopes.

Tourism

Lahaul Spiti valley is a common destination for Indian and foreign tourists for road trips, trekking and motorcycling.   The NH 21 route  from Manali to Leh covers the Suraj Tal Lake and the Bara-lacha-la pass.

Trekking
Trekking tours are common. One trek route is the Zingzingbar–Suraj Tal–Bara-lacha-la.

References

External links

 Suraj Tal Lake
 Surya Taal photos on Trek Earth
 Road and trekking map
 Lahaul and Spiti - Bara-lacha-la Pass

Lakes of Himachal Pradesh
Tourist attractions in Himachal Pradesh
Sacred lakes of India
Glacial lakes of India
Geography of Lahaul and Spiti district